The gens Precia was a minor plebeian family of equestrian rank at ancient Rome.  Members of this gens are first mentioned toward the end of the Republic.

Praenomina
The Precii known from history and inscriptions used the praenomina Lucius, Gaius, and Quintus, among the most common names at all periods.

Members

 Precia, the mistress of Publius Cornelius Cethegus.  Lucullus used her influence to obtain a command in the Third Mithridatic War.
 Lucius Precius, an eques and merchant at Panormus during the governorship of Verres in Sicily.  He may be the same Precius who left some property to Cicero.
 Precius, named Cicero as one of his heirs.
 Precianus, one of the Precii who was adopted into another gens, was a jurist, and friend of Cicero and his protégé, Trebatius Testa.  He was known and respected by Caesar.
 Quintus Precius, the father of Quintus Precius Proculus, named in an inscription from Septempeda in Picenum.
 Precius Cadus, named in an inscription from Aquileia in Venetia and Histria.
 Gaius Precius Felix Neapolitanus, named in an inscription from Pola in Venetia and Histria, dating from the proconsular command of Sextus Palpellius Hister, the consul of AD 43.
 Quintus Precius Q. f. Q. n. Hermes, the son of Quintus Precius Proculus and Graecina Paetina, named in an inscription from Ostra in Umbria.
 Quintus Precius Q. f. Proculus, a municipal official at Ostra in Umbria, was the husband of Graecina Paetina, for whom he built a tomb in Ostra, and the father of Quintus Precius Hermes.
 Precia Veneria, the wife of Valerius Zoticus and mother of Valeria Vitalis, whom Precia and Zoticus buried at Rome, aged seventeen years, nine months, and eighteen days.

See also
 List of Roman gentes

References

Bibliography
 Marcus Tullius Cicero, Epistulae ad Atticum, Epistulae ad Familiares, In Verrem.
 Plutarchus, Lives of the Noble Greeks and Romans.
 Dictionary of Greek and Roman Biography and Mythology, William Smith, ed., Little, Brown and Company, Boston (1849).
 Theodor Mommsen et alii, Corpus Inscriptionum Latinarum (The Body of Latin Inscriptions, abbreviated CIL), Berlin-Brandenburgische Akademie der Wissenschaften (1853–present).
 Giovanni Battista Brusin, Inscriptiones Aquileiae (Inscriptions of Aquileia, abbreviated InscrAqu), Udine (1991–1993).

Roman gentes